Emery Roth (July 17, 1871 – August 20, 1948) was an American architect of Hungarian-Jewish descent who designed many New York City hotels and apartment buildings of the 1920s and 1930s, incorporating Beaux-Arts and Art Deco details. His sons continued in the family enterprise, largely expanding the firm under the name Emery Roth & Sons.

Life and career 

Born in Gálszécs, Austria-Hungary (now Sečovce, Slovakia) to a Jewish family, he emigrated to the United States at the age of 13 after his family fell into poverty upon his father's death. He began his architectural apprenticeship as a draftsman in the Chicago offices of Burnham & Root, working on the World's Columbian Exposition of 1893. At the Exposition Roth also designed one of his first solo projects; a pavilion that housed a chocolatier. 

There he met Richard Morris Hunt, who was impressed with his skills and invited Roth to work in his office in New York. Following Hunt's premature death in 1895, Roth moved to the office of Ogden Codman, Jr., a designer and decorator with a Newport clientele. In the interwar years, the firm of Emery Roth delivered some of the most influential examples of architecture for apartment houses in the at-the-time fashionable beaux art-style, especially in Manhattan. 

Many of his most notable projects are located on the Upper West Side, specifically Central Park West which is home to the San Remo, the Beresford, the Ardsley, amongst others. In 1938, Roth included his sons Julian and Richard as partners.

Buildings designed

Emery Roth & Sons 
Despite the fact that Roth's sons, Julian and Richard, had joined the firm many years earlier, it was not until 1947 that the firm's name was changed to Emery Roth & Sons, approximately one year before Roth's death. Julian (1901–1992) specialized in construction costs and building materials and technology, while Richard (1904–1987) was named the firm's principal architect. 

In the 1950s and 1960s Emery Roth & Sons became the most influential architectural firm in New York and contributed substantially in changing the appearance of Midtown and Lower Manhattan. In that particular period of time Emery Roth & Sons designed dozens of speculative office buildings, mostly with curtain wall facades, which soon became a ubiquitous feature of the city. 

Beginning in the mid-1960s, the firm was also hired as associate architects in large-scale projects like the Pan Am Building (1963), the World Trade Center (1966–1973) and the Citicorp Center (1977). In the early 1960s, Richard Roth's son, Richard Roth, Jr. (b. 1933) became the third generation to join the firm, eventually rising to chief architect CEO and shareholder.

As the firm expanded and diversified over six decades, it remained a family business through the 1990s. In 1988 Richard Roth Jr's daughter Robyn Roth-Moise joined the firm as comptroller. Richard Roth Jr's son Richard Lee Roth joined the firm in 1982 and became the chief specification writer for Emery Roth & Sons. Both retired from the firm when Richard Roth Jr retired and was replaced as the company's CEO in 1993 by Robert Sobel, Roth's cousin. 

Only three years later, in 1996, the firm ceased to operate, apparently because of financial distress. Emery's great-grandson Richard Lee Roth currently works in the architectural profession and resides in South Florida.

The extensive architectural records and papers of both Emery Roth and Emery Roth & Sons are now held in the Department of Drawings & Archives at the Avery Architectural and Fine Arts Library at Columbia University.

Work by Emery Roth & Sons

 300 East 57th Street (1947)
 Paris Theater & Office Building (1948)
 715 Park Avenue (1949)
 945 Fifth Avenue Apartments (1949)
 Look Building, 488 Madison Avenue (1949)
 40 Park Avenue (1950)
 45 East End Avenue Apartments (1950)
 85 East End Avenue, NE corner of E83rd St (1950)
 575 Madison Avenue (1950)
 2 Fifth Avenue (1952)
 380 Madison Avenue (1953)
 30 Park Avenue (1954)
 555 Fifth Avenue (1954)
 589 Fifth Avenue (1954)
 National Distillers Building (1954)
 430 Park Avenue (Renovation) (1954)
 Baruch Houses (1954–1959)
 460 Park Avenue (1955)
 Bank of Montreal Building (1955)
 Colgate-Palmolive Building (1955)
 Davies Building (1955)
 156 William Street (1956)
 415 Madison Avenue (1956)
 485 Lexington Avenue (1956)
 1430 Broadway (1956)
 123 William Street (1957)
 630 Third Avenue (1958)
 750 Third Avenue (1958)
 400 Madison Avenue (1958)
 General Reinsurance Building (1958)
 100 Church Street (1958)
 166 East 63rd Street (Beekman Town House) (1959)
 2 Broadway (1959)
 10 Lafayette Square (Buffalo, New York) (1959)
 355 Lexington Avenue (1959)
 Bronx High School of Science (1959)
 Harriman National Bank Building (1959)
 Lorillard Building (1959)
 East Ohio Building (Cleveland, Ohio) (1959)
 10 East 70th Street Apartments (1960)
 80 Pine Street (1960)
 Imperial House, 150 East 69th Street (1960)
 Mutual of America Building (1960)
 850 Third Avenue (1961)
 Pfizer Building (1961)
 Diamond National Building (1961)
 60 Broad Street (1962)
 215 East 68th Apartments (1962)
 1180 Sixth Avenue (1962)
 Bankers Trust Building (1962)
 Tower East Apartments (1962)
 Hanover Bank Building (1962)
 1212 Sixth Avenue (1963)
 250 Broadway (1963)
 605 Third Avenue, (f/k/a Neuberger Berman Building, originally the Burroughs Building) (1963)
 845 Third Avenue (1963)
 1290 Avenue of the Americas, the Neuberger Berman building (1963)
 MetLife Building (Pan Am Building) (1963)
 Donaldson, Lufkin & Jenrette Building (1963)
 277 Park Avenue (1964)
 641 Lexington Avenue (1964)
 Harcourt, Brace & World Building (1964)
 Sterling Drug Company Building (90 Park Avenue) (1964)
 600 Madison Avenue (1965)
 Bankers Trust Annex Building (1965)
 Xerox Building (1965)
 MGM Building (1965)
 Leverett Saltonstall Building (1965)
 Financial Times Building (1965)
 675 Third Avenue (1966)
 MacMillan Building (1966)
 299 Park Avenue (a.k.a. Westvaco Building) (1967)
 909 Third Avenue (1967)
 ITT-American Building (1967)
 General Motors Building (1968)
 10 Hanover Square (1969)
 100 Wall Street (1969)
 345 Park Avenue (1969)
 1700 Broadway (1969)
 1345 Avenue of the Americas (1969)
 Random House Building (1969)
 Schroder Building (1969)
 Emigrant Savings Bank Building (1969)
 77 Water Street (1970)
 1633 Broadway (Paramount Plaza) (1970)
 1133 Avenue of the Americas (formerly Interchem Building) (1970)
 22 Cortlandt Street (1971)
 200 Water Street (a.k.a. 127 John Street) (1971)
 600 Third Avenue (1971)
 888 Seventh Avenue (1971)
 Capitol-EMI Building (1971)
 Park Lane Hotel (New York) (1971)
 J.P. Stevens Company Tower (1971)
 One Battery Park Plaza (1971)
 450 Park Avenue (1972)
 55 Water Street (1972)
 747 Third Avenue (1972)
 Harper & Row Building (1972)
 One Dag Hammarskjold Plaza (1972)
 North American Plywood Building (1972)
 Franklin National Bank Building (1972)
 World Trade Center (1972–1973) with Minoru Yamasaki
 100 East Pratt Street Building (1973)
 Blue Cross Building (1973)
 Merchandise Mart Building (1973)
 Sovereign Apartments (1973)
 Winstar Building and Addition (1974)
 100 William Street (1974)
 Citigroup Center (1977)
 Helmsley Palace Hotel (1981)
 Crystal Pavilion (1982)
 575 Fifth Avenue (1983)
 900 Third Avenue (1983)
 1155 Avenue of the Americas (1984)
 Manhattan Tower (1985)
 Symphony House Apartments (1986)
 Fifth Avenue Tower (1986)
 7 World Trade Center (1987)
 Ellington Apartments (1987)
 17 State Street (1988)
 1585 Broadway (1989)
 546 Fifth Avenue (1990)
 Oxford Condominiums (1990)

References

Further reading
Steven Ruttenbaum Mansions in the Cloud: The Skyscraper Palazzi of Emery Roth (1986)

External links

Emery Roth architectural drawings and autobiography, circa 1907-1949 (bulk circa 1920-1939) held in the Department of Drawings & Archives Avery Architectural and Fine Arts Library
Emery Roth & Sons architectural records and papers, 1906-1996 (bulk 1951-1994) held in the Department of Drawings & Archives Avery Architectural and Fine Arts Library
NYC-architecture: Emery Roth
Emery Roth: a more extended list of structures

1871 births
1948 deaths
People from the Kingdom of Hungary
People from Sečovce
Austro-Hungarian emigrants to the United States
Hungarian emigrants to the United States
American people of Hungarian-Jewish descent
American ecclesiastical architects
American residential architects
20th-century American architects
Jewish architects
World Trade Center